
Year 808 (DCCCVIII) was a leap year starting on Saturday (link will display the full calendar) of the Julian calendar.

Events 
 By place 

 Europe 
 King Godfred of the Danes forms an alliance with the Wiltzi and other Wendic tribes, against the pagan but pro-Frankish Abodrites. Godfred builds earthworks (Danevirke) across the isthmus of Schleswig-Holstein, separating Jutland from the northern extent of the Frankish Empire.
 Viking Age: First Viking raid, by Danes against the Baltic coast. Godfred destroys the Slav settlement of Reric (near present-day Wismar), used as a strategic trade route. The population is displaced or abducted, to Hedeby (Denmark).
 Emperor Charlemagne gives orders to construct two new forts on the Elbe River, garrisoning them against future Slav incursions.
 In Gharb al-Andalus (modern Portugal), Hazim ibn Wahb leads a rebellion against the Emirate of Córdoba.

 Britain 
 Exiled king Eardwulf of Northumbria is able to return to his kingdom, with the support of Charlemagne and Pope Leo III. He ousts the usurper, King Ælfwald II.
 Cadell ap Brochfael, king of Powys (modern Wales), dies after a 35-year reign, and is succeeded by his son Cyngen ap Cadell.

 By topic 

 Finance 
 Jewish merchants in Lombardy open the first bank (or money repository) in Italy (approximate date).

Births 
 September 27 – Ninmyō, emperor of Japan (d. 850)
 Emma of Altdorf, Frankish queen (or 803)
 Gottschalk of Orbais, German monk and theologian (approximate date)
 Kang Chengxun, general of the Tang Dynasty (approximate date)
 Kim Yang, viceroy of Silla (Korea) (d. 857)
 Walafrid Strabo, Frankish theological writer (approximate date)

Deaths 
 Ælfwald II, king of Northumbria (approximate date)
 Al-Fadl ibn Yahya al-Barmaki, Muslim governor (b. 766)
 Cadell ap Brochfael, king of Powys (Wales)
 Du Huangchang, chancellor of the Tang Dynasty
 Eanbald II, archbishop of York
 Elipando, Spanish archbishop and theologian (approximate date)
 Layman Pang, Chinese (Zen) Buddhist (b. 740)

References

Sources